Mario Capio (Nervi, 3 August 1924 – Nervi, 8 February 2000) was an Italian sailor who competed in the 1956 Summer Olympics, in the 1960 Summer Olympics, and in the 1964 Summer Olympics.

In 1955, he won the Snipe World Championship, and in 1959 the Flying Dutchman World Championships.

References

1924 births
2000 deaths
Italian male sailors (sport)
Olympic sailors of Italy
Sailors at the 1956 Summer Olympics – 12 m2 Sharpie
Sailors at the 1960 Summer Olympics – Flying Dutchman
Sailors at the 1964 Summer Olympics – Flying Dutchman
Snipe class world champions
World champions in sailing for Italy
Flying Dutchman class world champions
People from Nervi